Katherine Helen Sciver-Brunt (born 2 July 1985) is an English cricketer who currently plays for Trent Rockets and England. She plays as a right-arm fast bowler and right-handed lower-order batter. She has won two World Cups and one T20 World Cup with England, and has been named England women's Cricketer of the Year four times. In June 2022, Brunt announced her retirement from playing Test cricket. She played in 14 Test matches for England from 2004 to 2022.

Career

An aggressive right arm fast bowler with a classical action, she played for Yorkshire age group sides before taking a break from cricket at the age of 17 due to fitness concerns.  She went to Penistone Grammar School, Barnsley, South Yorkshire.  She returned for the Test against New Zealand in 2004 and was a member of the 2005 England World Cup side in South Africa.  She took 14 wickets and scored her maiden half century as England won the Ashes in 2005 and opened the bowling in England's successful 2009 World Cup Campaign.

She was Player of the Match in the 2009 Twenty20 World championship final at Lords, taking 3 wickets for 6 runs in her 4 over opening spell and took a career best 6 for 69 in the one off Ashes Test which followed.  Her best figures in one day internationals came in the final of the 2011 NatWest Women's Quadrangular Series where her 5 for 18 bowled England to victory over Australia.

She is the holder of one of the first tranche of 18 ECB central contracts for women players, which were announced in April 2014.

Brunt was a member of the winning women's team at the 2017 Women's Cricket World Cup held in England.

In October 2018, she was named in England's squad for the 2018 ICC Women's World Twenty20 tournament in the West Indies. However, she was ruled out of the tournament due to a back injury and was replaced by Fran Wilson.

In February 2019, she was awarded a full central contract by the England and Wales Cricket Board (ECB) for 2019. In June 2019, the ECB named her in England's squad for their opening match against Australia to contest the Women's Ashes.

In December 2019, in the opening match of England's series against Pakistan in Malaysia, Brunt took her 150th wicket in WODI matches. In January 2020, she was named in England's squad for the 2020 ICC Women's T20 World Cup in Australia.

On 18 June 2020, Brunt was named in a squad of 24 players to begin training ahead of international women's fixtures starting in England following the COVID-19 pandemic. In June 2021, Brunt was named as in England's Test squad for their one-off match against India. In December 2021, Brunt was named in England's squad for their tour to Australia to contest the Women's Ashes. In February 2022, she was named in England's team for the 2022 Women's Cricket World Cup in New Zealand.

In April 2022, she was bought by the Trent Rockets for the 2022 season of The Hundred. In July 2022, she was named in England's team for the cricket tournament at the 2022 Commonwealth Games in Birmingham, England. Later the same month, during England's home series against South Africa, Brunt took her 100th wicket in WT20I cricket. On 30 July 2022, in England's first fixture of the Commonwealth Games, against Sri Lanka, Brunt played in her 100th WT20I match. In January 2023, Brunt announced her retirement from county and regional cricket.

Personal life
Brunt's nicknames are "Brunty" and "Nunny". In 2015, she explained to sports journalist Clare Balding that she is known as Nunny because she had set off a fire alarm during a residential cricket course at the Benedictine-run Ampleforth College.

In October 2019, Brunt announced her engagement to fellow England cricketer Nat Sciver. They were scheduled to get married in September 2020, but their wedding was postponed due to the COVID-19 pandemic. The couple eventually married in May 2022. Both changed their last name to Sciver-Brunt when they married, and in January 2023 it was announced that the pair would both go by the name in all cricket-related instances.

Awards
 ECB Cricketer of the Year – 2006, 2010, 2012–13

References

External links

 The Final Word Podcast: Interview of Katherine Brunt (published 3 August 2022) – on Apple Podcasts, on Google Podcasts, on Spotify and on YouTube

1985 births
Living people
England women One Day International cricketers
England women Test cricketers
England women Twenty20 International cricketers
People educated at Penistone Grammar School
Cricketers from Barnsley
Yorkshire women cricketers
Yorkshire Diamonds cricketers
Northern Diamonds cricketers
Perth Scorchers (WBBL) cricketers
Melbourne Stars (WBBL) cricketers
English LGBT sportspeople
LGBT cricketers
Lesbian sportswomen
Trent Rockets cricketers
Cricketers at the 2022 Commonwealth Games
Commonwealth Games competitors for England